Mrs. Clinton Walker House, also known as Cabin on the Rocks, is located on Carmel Point, near Carmel-by-the-Sea, California. It has the appearance of a ship with a bow cutting through the waves. The house was designed by Frank Lloyd Wright in 1948 and completed in 1952 for Mrs. Clinton "Della" Walker of Pebble Beach. It was listed on the National Register of Historic Places in 1977.

Design of Mrs. Clinton Walker House

The house, an example of Wright's organic architecture, is built on granite boulders, uses the local Carmel-stone, and has a roof the color of the sea that is shaped to resemble the bow of a ship. It is the only Frank Lloyd Wright house that overlooks the ocean. Della Walker told Wright she wanted a house “as durable as the rocks and as transparent as the waves." The house has a view of the Carmel Bay and Pebble Beach.

Mrs. Clinton Walker House was built by Miles Bain. It has a Usonian design; it is a small (originally only 1,200 square feet), single-story house that incorporates a hexagon floor with 120-degree angles, with three rooms completely open with views of the ocean. The low roof was onced covered with triangular porcelain panels because of the copper restrictions during the Korean War in the 1950s. Della later replaced it with copper shingles. The living-dining room is centered around a floor-to-ceiling fireplace with built-in furniture. The hexagonal modules of the floor plan gave the appearance of a honeycomb. The window frames are painted in Wright's signature "Cherokee Red" color with reverse-stepped glass windows. A master bedroom was added in 1956. The house is similar to the Hanna House in Palo Alto.

In 1954, Wright said, "The over-all-effect is quiet, and the long white surf lines of the sea seem to join the lines of the house to make a natural melody." The California Style landscape design was achieved by  Thomas Church, who is one of the pioneer landscape designers of the 20th-century.

In the 1959 movie A Summer Place, the characters Ken Jorgenson (Richard Egan) and Sylvia (Dorothy McGuire) have a beach house, which was filmed at the Clinton Walker House. In the film, Sylvia tells Molly (Sandra Dee) that Frank Lloyd Wright designed the house, seemingly located on the East Coast near the movie's "Pine Island" location. The film shows views of the Walker house's interior, exterior and patio. Additional scenes were filmed at a cottage located at Mission Ranch Hotel and Restaurant in Carmel.

Della added an addition, in 1960, to the master bedroom based on a 1956 studio addition that was designed by Wright. It was completed by some of the original carpenters that had built the house.

In 2018, the wall or prow of the building facing the water was replaced because the Carmel stone had worn away and water had gotten inside the concrete.

The house sold off-market in February 2023 for $22 million.

Gallery

See also
 National Register of Historic Places listings in Monterey County, California

References

External links

 A Curated Tour of the Mrs. Clinton Walker House
 Frank Lloyd Wright Sites
 Frank Lloyd Wright: American architect for the twentieth century
 The life & works of Frank Lloyd Wright
 Home of the Week Overlooking Carmel Bay
 Mrs. Clinton Walker house (Carmel, California). Cabin on the Rocks

1951 establishments in California
Frank Lloyd Wright buildings
Houses completed in 1951
Houses on the National Register of Historic Places in Monterey County, California
Modernist architecture in California